Robert Stephen Ganley (April 23, 1875 – October 9, 1945) was an Irish-American professional baseball player who played as an outfielder in Major League Baseball from 1905 through 1909. He played for the Pittsburgh Pirates, Washington Senators and Philadelphia Athletics.

In 572 games over five seasons, Ganley posted a .254 batting average (540-for-2129) with 246 runs, 2 home runs, 123 RBI, 112 stolen bases and 177 bases on balls.

External links

1875 births
1945 deaths
Major League Baseball outfielders
Baseball players from Massachusetts
Pittsburgh Pirates players
Philadelphia Athletics players
Washington Senators (1901–1960) players
Minor league baseball managers
New Haven Blues players
Albany Senators players
Brockton Shoemakers players
Columbus Senators players
Marion Glass Blowers players
Toledo Swamp Angels players
Schenectady Electricians players
Kansas City Cowboys (minor league) players
Milwaukee Brewers (minor league) players
Johnstown Johnnies players
Oakland Oaks (baseball) players
Des Moines Underwriters players
Newark Indians players
Atlanta Crackers players
Perth Amboy Pacers players